Anatoly Semyonovich Levchenko (May 5, 1941 – August 6, 1988) was a Soviet cosmonaut in the Buran programme.

Trained as a test pilot and selected as a cosmonaut on 12 July 1980, Levchenko was planned to be the back-up commander of the first Buran space shuttle flight. As part of his preparations, he also accomplished test-flights with Buran's counterpart OK-GLI aircraft.

In March 1987,  Levchenko began extensive training for a Soyuz spaceflight, intended to give him some experience in space. In December 1987, he occupied the third seat aboard the spacecraft Soyuz TM-4 to the space station Mir, and returned to Earth about a week later on Soyuz TM-3. His mission is sometimes called Mir LII-1, after the Gromov Flight Research Institute shorthand.

In the year following his spaceflight, Anatoly Levchenko died of a brain tumor, in the Nikolay Burdenko Neurosurgical Institute in Moscow. 

He was married with one child.

Awards
He was awarded the titles of Hero of the Soviet Union and Pilot-Cosmonaut of the USSR and the Order of Lenin.

Commemoration

 Anatoly Levchenko is buried at the Bykovskoye Memorial Cemetery in Zhukovsky. 
 There is a memorial plate with his image installed on the wall of house 2 at Chkalova Street where Anatoly once lived in Zhukovsky.

See also
List of notable brain tumor patients

References

1941 births
1988 deaths
People from Kharkiv Oblast
Heroes of the Soviet Union
Soviet Air Force officers
Soviet cosmonauts
Buran program
Soviet test pilots
Gromov Flight Research Institute employees
Mir crew members